Luigi Villari (1876–1959), son of Pasquale Villari and Linda White Mazini Villari, was an Italian historian, traveler and diplomat. He worked in the Italian Foreign Office and was later a newspaper correspondent. Villari served as Italy's Vice-Consul in three American cities: New Orleans (1906), Philadelphia (1907) and Boston (1907–10). He devoted most of his life to the study of international problems, more especially to the relations between Italy and the English-speaking countries.  He also authored numerous books and travelogues including those dedicated to his travels in the late Russian Empire.

References

External links

 
 
 
 

1876 births
1959 deaths
20th-century Italian historians
Italian diplomats